Shi Qian is a fictional character in Water Margin, one of the Four Great Classical Novels in Chinese literature. Nicknamed "Flea on a Drum", he ranks 107th among the 108 Stars of Destiny and 71st among the 72 Earthly Fiends.

Background
Shi Qian is a native of Gaotangzhou (高唐州; present-day Gaotang County, Shandong). He  a masterful burglar who, with his slimness and small size, could nimbly scale walls and move on rooftops to get into premises. Nicknamed "Flea on a Drum" for his agility, Shi Qian lives in Jizhou (蓟州; present-day Ji County, Tianjin) and targets the homes there. He once ran into trouble with the authorities but got out of it helped by chief warden Yang Xiong.

Joining Liangshan

One day, while stealing valuables from graves on Mount Cuiping, Shi Qian comes upon, undetected, Yang Xiong killing his infidel wife Pan Qiaoyun. Upon hearing Yang discussing with Shi Xiu about joining the outlaw band of Liangshan Marsh, he shows himself and asks them to take him along. On the way, the three stop to eat in an inn of the Zhu Family Manor.

A row breaks out between the trio and the innkeeper after Shi Qian stole the rooster of the inn and cooked it for meal as the place has no palatable food. After burning down the inn, they flee chased by dozens of men fetched by the innkeeper. But Shi Qian falls into a trap and is captured. Yang Xiong and Shi Xiu stumble into the neighbouring Li Family Manor, where they run into Du Xing, who has once received help from Yang at Jizhou. Du takes them to his master Li Ying, who writes two successive letters requesting the Zhus to release Shi Qian. But the Zhus refuse. Li Ying is injured by an arrow when he goes to confront them. Reaching Liangshan, Yang Xiong and Shi Xiu ask for its help to rescue Shi Qian. Shi is freed when Liangshan overruns the Zhu Family Manor in its third offensive.

Life at Liangshan
Shi Qian makes major contributions when at Liangshan, the most notable being his role in duping Xu Ning, an imperial guard instructor, to join the band. The plan, devised by Xu's cousin Tang Long, requires Shi Qian to break into Xu's house in the imperial capital Dongjing to steal a precious heirloom of the instructor - an impenetrable lightweight armoured vest. Shi easily steals into Xu's house after nightfall and slithers onto the rafter on which the box containing the vest is kept. He stays there till daybreak before sneaking away with the box. Then Tang visits Xu, who is greatly upset over the loss, and claims that he has seen a man carrying a box fitting Xu's description. So Xu goes on a long chase after Shi Qian, accompanied by Tang, which leads him to the vicinity of Liangshan. He is then being drugged and taken up to the stronghold. Finding himself trapped, Xu has no choice but to join the band. Xu is needed by Liangshan for his skill in using the hooked lance -- a weapon that could fell the chain-linked armoured cavalry of the imperial general Huyan Zhuo, who is laying siege to the stronghold. Huyan's army is routed when his cavalry collapses pulled down by the hooked lance squad of Liangshan. 

Shi Qian also plays a key role in rescuing Lu Junyi and Shi Xiu from the prison in Daming Prefecture. Wu Yong sends a number of chieftains to infiltrate Daming on the night of the Lantern Festival by mingling in the festive crowd. Shi Qian is assigned to set fire to the Jade Cloud Tower, a prominent landmark in the city, as a signal to them to launch a simultaneous rampage across the city. With the authorities thrown into panic and confusion, Lu Junyi and Shi Xiu are easily extracted from prison.

Campaigns and death

Shi Qian is appointed as one of the scout leaders of Liangshan after the 108 Stars of Destiny came together in what is called the Grand Assembly. He participates in the campaigns against the Liao invaders and rebel forces in Song territory following amnesty from Emperor Huizong for Liangshan.

Shi Qian dies from an intestinal disease soon after the Liangshan force stamped out the rebellion of Fang La.

References
 
 
 
 
 
 
 

72 Earthly Fiends
Fictional professional thieves
Fictional characters from Shandong